Jiguan may refer to:

Ancestral home (Chinese) (籍貫)
Jiguan District (鸡冠) of Jixi City, Heilongjiang